In nuclear physics, a nuclear chain reaction occurs when one single nuclear reaction causes an average of one or more subsequent nuclear reactions, thus leading to the possibility of a self-propagating series of these reactions. The specific nuclear reaction may be the fission of heavy isotopes (e.g., uranium-235, 235U). A nuclear chain reaction releases several million times more energy per reaction than any chemical reaction.

History

Chemical chain reactions were first proposed by German chemist Max Bodenstein in 1913, and were reasonably well understood before nuclear chain reactions were proposed. It was understood that chemical chain reactions were responsible for exponentially increasing rates in reactions, such as produced in chemical explosions.

The concept of a nuclear chain reaction was reportedly first hypothesized by Hungarian scientist Leó Szilárd on September 12, 1933. Szilárd that morning had been reading in a London paper of an experiment in which protons from an accelerator had been used to split lithium-7 into alpha particles, and the fact that much greater amounts of energy were produced by the reaction than the proton supplied. Ernest Rutherford commented in the article that inefficiencies in the process precluded use of it for power generation. However, the neutron had been discovered by James Chadwick in 1932, shortly before, as the product of a nuclear reaction. Szilárd, who had been trained as an engineer and physicist, put the two nuclear experimental results together in his mind and realized that if a nuclear reaction produced neutrons, which then caused further similar nuclear reactions, the process might be a self-perpetuating nuclear chain-reaction, spontaneously producing new isotopes and power without the need for protons or an accelerator. Szilárd, however, did not propose fission as the mechanism for his chain reaction, since the fission reaction was not yet discovered, or even suspected. Instead, Szilárd proposed using mixtures of lighter known isotopes which produced neutrons in copious amounts. He filed a patent for his idea of a simple nuclear reactor the following year.

In 1936, Szilárd attempted to create a chain reaction using beryllium and indium, but was unsuccessful. Nuclear fission was discovered by Otto Hahn and Fritz Strassmann in December 1938 and explained theoretically in January 1939 by Lise Meitner and her nephew Otto Robert Frisch. In their second publication on nuclear fission in February of 1939, Hahn and Strassmann used the term Uranspaltung (uranium fission) for the first time, and predicted the existence and liberation of additional neutrons during the fission process, opening up the possibility of a nuclear chain reaction.

A few months later, Frédéric Joliot-Curie, H. Von Halban and L. Kowarski in Paris searched for, and discovered, neutron multiplication in uranium, proving that a nuclear chain reaction by this mechanism was indeed possible.

On May 4, 1939, Joliot-Curie, Halban, and Kowarski filed three patents. The first two described power production from a nuclear chain reaction, the last one called Perfectionnement aux charges explosives was the first patent for the atomic bomb and is filed as patent No. 445686 by the Caisse nationale de Recherche Scientifique.

In parallel, Szilárd and Enrico Fermi in New York made the same analysis. This discovery prompted the letter from Szilárd and signed by Albert Einstein to President Franklin D. Roosevelt, warning of the possibility that Nazi Germany might be attempting to build an atomic bomb.

On December 2, 1942, a team led by Fermi (and including Szilárd) produced the first artificial self-sustaining nuclear chain reaction with the Chicago Pile-1 (CP-1) experimental reactor in a racquets court below the bleachers of Stagg Field at the University of Chicago. Fermi's experiments at the University of Chicago were part of Arthur H. Compton's Metallurgical Laboratory of the Manhattan Project; the lab was later renamed Argonne National Laboratory, and tasked with conducting research in harnessing fission for nuclear energy.

In 1956, Paul Kuroda of the University of Arkansas postulated that a natural fission reactor may have once existed. Kuroda's prediction was verified with the discovery of evidence of natural self-sustaining nuclear chain reactions in the past at Oklo in Gabon in September 1972. To sustain a nuclear fission chain reaction at present isotope ratios in natural uranium on earth would require the presence of a neutron moderator like heavy water or high purity carbon (e.g. graphite) in the absence of neutron poisons, which is even more unlikely to arise by natural geological processes than the conditions at Oklo some two billion years ago.

Fission chain reaction

Fission chain reactions occur because of interactions between neutrons and fissile isotopes (such as 235U). The chain reaction requires both the release of neutrons from fissile isotopes undergoing nuclear fission and the subsequent absorption of some of these neutrons in fissile isotopes. When an atom undergoes nuclear fission, a few neutrons (the exact number depends on uncontrollable and unmeasurable factors; the expected number depends on several factors, usually between 2.5 and 3.0) are ejected from the reaction. These free neutrons will then interact with the surrounding medium, and if more fissile fuel is present, some may be absorbed and cause more fissions. Thus, the cycle repeats to give a reaction that is self-sustaining.

Nuclear power plants operate by precisely controlling the rate at which nuclear reactions occur. Nuclear weapons, on the other hand, are specifically engineered to produce a reaction that is so fast and intense it cannot be controlled after it has started. When properly designed, this uncontrolled reaction will lead to an explosive energy release.

Nuclear fission fuel
Nuclear weapons employ high quality, highly enriched fuel exceeding the critical size and geometry (critical mass) necessary in order to obtain an explosive chain reaction. The fuel for energy purposes, such as in a nuclear fission reactor, is very different, usually consisting of a low-enriched oxide material (e.g. UO2). There are two primary isotopes used for fission reactions inside of nuclear reactors. The first and most common is uranium-235. This is the fissile isotope of uranium and it makes up approximately 0.7% of all naturally occurring uranium. Because of the small amount of 235U that exists, it is considered a non-renewable energy source despite being found in rock formations around the world. Uranium-235 cannot be used as fuel in its base form for energy production. It must undergo a process known as refinement to produce the compound UO2 or uranium dioxide. The uranium dioxide is then pressed and formed into ceramic pellets, which can subsequently be placed into fuel rods. This is when the compound uranium dioxide can be used for nuclear power production. The second most common isotope used in nuclear fission is plutonium-239. This is due to its ability to become fissile with slow neutron interaction. This isotope is formed inside nuclear reactors through exposing 238U to the neutrons released during fission. As a result of neutron capture, uranium-239 is produced, which undergoes two beta decays to become plutonium-239. Plutonium once was occurred as a primordial element in the earth's crust, but only trace amounts remain, so it is predominantly synthetic. Another proposed fuel for nuclear reactors, which however plays no commercial role as of 2021, is uranium-233, which is "bred" by neutron capture and subsequent beta decays from natural thorium, which is almost 100% composed of the isotope thorium-232. This is called the thorium fuel cycle.

Enrichment process 
The fissile isotope uranium-235 in its natural concentration is unfit for the vast majority nuclear reactors. In order to be prepared for use as fuel in energy production, it must be enriched. The enrichment process does not apply to plutonium. Reactor-grade plutonium is created as a byproduct of neutron interaction between two different isotopes of uranium. The first step to enriching uranium begins by converting uranium oxide (created through the uranium milling process) into a gaseous form. This gas is known as uranium hexafluoride, which is created by combining hydrogen fluoride, fluorine gas, and uranium oxide. Uranium dioxide is also present in this process and it is sent off to be used in reactors not requiring enriched fuel. The remaining uranium hexafluoride compound is drained into strong metal cylinders where it solidifies. The next step is separating the uranium hexafluoride from the depleted U-235 left over. This is typically done with centrifuges that spin fast enough to allow for the 1% mass difference in uranium isotopes to separate themselves. A laser is then used to enrich the hexafluoride compound. The final step involves reconverting the now enriched compound back into uranium oxide, leaving the final product: enriched uranium oxide. This form of UO2 can now be used in fission reactors inside power plants to produce energy.

Fission reaction products

When a fissile atom undergoes nuclear fission, it breaks into two or more fission fragments. Also, several free neutrons, gamma rays, and neutrinos are emitted, and a large amount of energy is released. The sum of the rest masses of the fission fragments and ejected neutrons is less than the sum of the rest masses of the original atom and incident neutron (of course the fission fragments are not at rest). The mass difference is accounted for in the release of energy according to the equation E=Δmc2:

mass of released energy = 

Due to the extremely large value of the speed of light, c, a small decrease in mass is associated with a tremendous release of active energy (for example, the kinetic energy of the fission fragments). This energy (in the form of radiation and heat) carries the missing mass, when it leaves the reaction system (total mass, like total energy, is always conserved). While typical chemical reactions release energies on the order of a few eVs (e.g. the binding energy of the electron to hydrogen is 13.6 eV), nuclear fission reactions typically release energies on the order of hundreds of millions of eVs.

Two typical fission reactions are shown below with average values of energy released and number of neutrons ejected:

Note that these equations are for fissions caused by slow-moving (thermal) neutrons. The average energy released and number of neutrons ejected is a function of the incident neutron speed. Also, note that these equations exclude energy from neutrinos since these subatomic particles are extremely non-reactive and, therefore, rarely deposit their energy in the system.

Timescales of nuclear chain reactions

Prompt neutron lifetime

The prompt neutron lifetime, l, is the average time between the emission of neutrons and either their absorption in the system or their escape from the system. The neutrons that occur directly from fission are called "prompt neutrons", and the ones that are a result of radioactive decay of fission fragments are called "delayed neutrons". The term lifetime is used because the emission of a neutron is often considered its "birth", and the subsequent absorption is considered its "death". For thermal (slow-neutron) fission reactors, the typical prompt neutron lifetime is on the order of 10−4 seconds, and for fast fission reactors, the prompt neutron lifetime is on the order of 10−7 seconds. These extremely short lifetimes mean that in 1 second, 10,000 to 10,000,000 neutron lifetimes can pass. The average (also referred to as the adjoint unweighted) prompt neutron lifetime takes into account all prompt neutrons regardless of their importance in the reactor core; the effective prompt neutron lifetime (referred to as the adjoint weighted over space, energy, and angle) refers to a neutron with average importance.

Mean generation time

The mean generation time, Λ, is the average time from a neutron emission to a capture that results in fission. The mean generation time is different from the prompt neutron lifetime because the mean generation time only includes neutron absorptions that lead to fission reactions (not other absorption reactions). The two times are related by the following formula:

In this formula, k is the effective neutron multiplication factor, described below.

Effective neutron multiplication factor

The six factor formula effective neutron multiplication factor, k, is the average number of neutrons from one fission that cause another fission. The remaining neutrons either are absorbed in non-fission reactions or leave the system without being absorbed. The value of k determines how a nuclear chain reaction proceeds:
 k < 1 (subcriticality): The system cannot sustain a chain reaction, and any beginning of a chain reaction dies out over time. For every fission that is induced in the system, an average total of 1/(1 − k) fissions occur. Proposed subcritical reactors make use of the fact that a nuclear reaction sustained by an external neutron source can be "switched off" when the neutron source is removed. This provides a certain degree of inherent safety.
 k = 1 (criticality): Every fission causes an average of one more fission, leading to a fission (and power) level that is constant. Nuclear power plants operate with k = 1 unless the power level is being increased or decreased.
 k > 1 (supercriticality): For every fission in the material, it is likely that there will be "k" fissions after the next mean generation time (Λ). The result is that the number of fission reactions increases exponentially, according to the equation , where t is the elapsed time. Nuclear weapons are designed to operate under this state. There are two subdivisions of supercriticality: prompt and delayed.
When describing kinetics and dynamics of nuclear reactors, and also in the practice of reactor operation, the concept of reactivity is used, which characterizes the deflection of reactor from the critical state: ρ = (k − 1)/k. InHour (from inverse of an hour, sometimes abbreviated ih or inhr) is a unit of reactivity of a nuclear reactor.

In a nuclear reactor, k will actually oscillate from slightly less than 1 to slightly more than 1, due primarily to thermal effects (as more power is produced, the fuel rods warm and thus expand, lowering their capture ratio, and thus driving k lower). This leaves the average value of k at exactly 1. Delayed neutrons play an important role in the timing of these oscillations.

In an infinite medium, the multiplication factor may be described by the four factor formula; in a non-infinite medium, the multiplication factor may be described by the six factor formula.

Prompt and delayed supercriticality

Not all neutrons are emitted as a direct product of fission; some are instead due to the radioactive decay of some of the fission fragments. The neutrons that occur directly from fission are called "prompt neutrons", and the ones that are a result of radioactive decay of fission fragments are called "delayed neutrons". The fraction of neutrons that are delayed is called β, and this fraction is typically less than 1% of all the neutrons in the chain reaction.

The delayed neutrons allow a nuclear reactor to respond several orders of magnitude more slowly than just prompt neutrons would alone. Without delayed neutrons, changes in reaction rates in nuclear reactors would occur at speeds that are too fast for humans to control.

The region of supercriticality between k = 1 and k = 1/(1 − β) is known as delayed supercriticality (or delayed criticality). It is in this region that all nuclear power reactors operate. The region of supercriticality for k > 1/(1 − β) is known as prompt supercriticality (or prompt criticality), which is the region in which nuclear weapons operate.

The change in k needed to go from critical to prompt critical is defined as a dollar.

Nuclear weapons application of neutron multiplication

Nuclear fission weapons require a mass of fissile fuel that is prompt supercritical.

For a given mass of fissile material the value of k can be increased by increasing the density. Since the probability per distance travelled for a neutron to collide with a nucleus is proportional to the material density, increasing the density of a fissile material can increase k. This concept is utilized in the implosion method for nuclear weapons. In these devices, the nuclear chain reaction begins after increasing the density of the fissile material with a conventional explosive.

In the gun-type fission weapon, two subcritical pieces of fuel are rapidly brought together. The value of k for a combination of two masses is always greater than that of its components. The magnitude of the difference depends on distance, as well as the physical orientation.

The value of k can also be increased by using a neutron reflector surrounding the fissile material

Once the mass of fuel is prompt supercritical, the power increases exponentially. However, the exponential power increase cannot continue for long since k decreases when the amount of fission material that is left decreases (i.e. it is consumed by fissions). Also, the geometry and density are expected to change during detonation since the remaining fission material is torn apart from the explosion.

Predetonation

Detonation of a nuclear weapon involves bringing fissile material into its optimal supercritical state very rapidly. During part of this process, the assembly is supercritical, but not yet in an optimal state for a chain reaction. Free neutrons, in particular from spontaneous fissions, can cause the device to undergo a preliminary chain reaction that destroys the fissile material before it is ready to produce a large explosion, which is known as predetonation.

To keep the probability of predetonation low, the duration of the non-optimal assembly period is minimized and fissile and other materials are used that have low spontaneous fission rates. In fact, the combination of materials has to be such that it is unlikely that there is even a single spontaneous fission during the period of supercritical assembly. In particular, the gun method cannot be used with plutonium (see nuclear weapon design).

Nuclear power plants and control of chain reactions 

Chain reactions naturally give rise to reaction rates that grow (or shrink) exponentially, whereas a nuclear power reactor needs to be able to hold the reaction rate reasonably constant. To maintain this control, the chain reaction criticality must have a slow enough time scale to permit intervention by additional effects (e.g., mechanical control rods or thermal expansion). Consequently, all nuclear power reactors (even fast-neutron reactors) rely on delayed neutrons for their criticality. An operating nuclear power reactor fluctuates between being slightly subcritical and slightly delayed-supercritical, but must always remain below prompt-critical.

It is impossible for a nuclear power plant to undergo a nuclear chain reaction that results in an explosion of power comparable with a nuclear weapon, but even low-powered explosions due to uncontrolled chain reactions (that would be considered "fizzles" in a bomb) may still cause considerable damage and meltdown in a reactor. For example, the Chernobyl disaster involved a runaway chain reaction but the result was a low-powered steam explosion from the relatively small release of heat, as compared with a bomb. However, the reactor complex was destroyed by the heat, as well as by ordinary burning of the graphite exposed to air. Such steam explosions would be typical of the very diffuse assembly of materials in a nuclear reactor, even under the worst conditions.

In addition, other steps can be taken for safety. For example, power plants licensed in the United States require a negative void coefficient of reactivity (this means that if coolant is removed from the reactor core, the nuclear reaction will tend to shut down, not increase). This eliminates the possibility of the type of accident that occurred at Chernobyl (which was due to a positive void coefficient). However, nuclear reactors are still capable of causing smaller explosions even after complete shutdown, such as was the case of the Fukushima Daiichi nuclear disaster. In such cases, residual decay heat from the core may cause high temperatures if there is loss of coolant flow, even a day after the chain reaction has been shut down (see SCRAM). This may cause a chemical reaction between water and fuel that produces hydrogen gas, which can explode after mixing with air, with severe contamination consequences, since fuel rod material may still be exposed to the atmosphere from this process. However, such explosions do not happen during a chain reaction, but rather as a result of energy from radioactive beta decay, after the fission chain reaction has been stopped.

See also 

 Proton–proton chain
 Criticality accident
 Nuclear criticality safety
 Nuclear physics
 Nuclear reactor physics

References

External links 
 Nuclear Chain Reaction Animation
 Annotated bibliography on nuclear chain reactions from the Alsos Digital Library
 Stochastic Java simulation of nuclear chain reaction  by Wolfgang Bauer

Chain reaction, nuclear
Nuclear fission